Following is a list of notable restaurants in Baltimore, in the U.S. state of Maryland:

 Andy Nelson's Southern Pit Barbecue
 Attman's Delicatessen
 Brass Elephant
 The Brewer's Art
 Brooklandville House
 Cafe Hon
 Chicken George
 Gino's Hamburgers
 Haussner's Restaurant
 Little Tavern
 Looney's Pub
 Martick's Restaurant Francais
 Venice Tavern
 White Coffee Pot
 Woodberry Kitchen

Restaurants
Baltimore